Mauricio Nicolás Carrasco (born 24 September 1987) is an Argentine footballer who plays as a forward.

Football career
Carrasco started his football career when he joined Estudiantes de la Plata youth academy. He was promoted to the senior squad in 2008. In 2009, he joined Quilmes on a one year loan. He then rejoined his club but he didn't play any match. He went again on loan, this time to Aldovisi where he played thirty one times and scored seven goals. The following season would find him again away from Estudiantes as he went on loan to Patronato. He made twenty nine appearances and his scored eleven times, which is his own personal record of goals in a season. In 2013 Carrasco, move on loan to the Superleague Greece club Asteras Tripolis F.C. He played in thirty four matches and scored eleven goals, tieing his own record of goals in a season. In his contract there was also a 360.000€ fee if Asteras wanted to buy the player. Although, Asteras desire to buy Carrasco, Estudiantes insisted on the price that it was set on the contract and Asteras didn't make an official bid for the player.

Carrasco returned to Estudiantes after his successful loan spell in Greece and so far he played in five games but he hasn't score yet, any goals.

Honours

Estudiantes 
Primera División (2): 2007 Apertura, x1 Runners-up 2010 Clausura, 2011 Apertura
Copa Libertadores (1): 2009
Recopa Sudamericana: x1 Runners-up 2010 Recopa Sudamericana
FIFA Club World Cup: x1 Runners-up 2009 FIFA Club World Cup

References

External links
League statistics

1987 births
Living people
Argentine footballers
Argentine expatriate footballers
Association football forwards
People from Neuquén
Argentine Primera División players
Primera Nacional players
Bolivian Primera División players
Super League Greece players
Quilmes Atlético Club footballers
Aldosivi footballers
Asteras Tripolis F.C. players
Atromitos F.C. players
Nueva Chicago footballers
Club Atlético Patronato footballers
Boca Unidos footballers
Royal Pari F.C. players
Gimnasia y Tiro footballers
Club Atlético Brown footballers
Argentine expatriate sportspeople in Greece
Argentine expatriate sportspeople in Bolivia
Expatriate footballers in Greece
Expatriate footballers in Bolivia